Munokoa Fellesite Tunupopo (born 23 February 1984) is a New Zealand former cricketer who played as a right-arm medium bowler. She appeared in 3 One Day Internationals for New Zealand in 2000, becoming, at age 15, the youngest player to represent New Zealand. She played domestic cricket for Auckland, and was the youngest domestic cricketer on record when she began playing.

Early life and career
Tunupopo was born in 1984 in Tokoroa, Waikato, in the North Island of New Zealand, and attended Onehunga High School and Auckland Girls' Grammar School. In 1998 she began playing cricket for Auckland in the State Insurance Cup. At 14 years and nine months she was the youngest domestic cricketer in the history of the tournament, and was the leading wicket-taker, with 21 wickets, in the 1999/00 season. In February 2000, she played for New Zealand A against Australia Under-21s before, later that month, making her One Day International debut against England, becoming the youngest ever New Zealand international cricketer, at age 15. She went on to play three matches in the series, but did not take a wicket.

References

External links
 
 

Living people
1984 births
Sportspeople from Tokoroa
New Zealand women cricketers
New Zealand women One Day International cricketers
Auckland Hearts cricketers
People educated at Auckland Girls' Grammar School
People educated at Onehunga High School
Cricketers from Waikato